Maud van der Meer (born 20 May 1992) is a former Dutch competitive swimmer. She won the gold medal at the 2011 World Aquatics Championships in the 4 × 100 metre freestyle relay (she only competed in the heats) and the silver medal at the 2015 World Aquatics Championships in the 4 × 100 metre freestyle relay (together with Ranomi Kromowidjojo, Marrit Steenbergen and Femke Heemskerk).

At the 2016 Summer Olympics in Rio de Janeiro Van der Meer competed in the heats of the 4 × 100 meter freestyle relay, where the team finished 5th and qualified for the final. In the final the Dutch team, without Van der Meer, went on to finish in 4th place.

References

External links

Maud van der Meer Sports bio

1992 births
Living people
Dutch female freestyle swimmers
Dutch female medley swimmers
Olympic swimmers of the Netherlands
Swimmers at the 2016 Summer Olympics
World Aquatics Championships medalists in swimming
European Aquatics Championships medalists in swimming
World record holders in swimming
People from Uden
Medalists at the FINA World Swimming Championships (25 m)
21st-century Dutch women
Sportspeople from North Brabant